The Dongwu line is a single-track electrified freight-only railway line from Putian railway station to the Port of Meizhou Bay.

History
Construction began in July 2008. The line opened on 30 December 2013.

References

Railway lines in China
Railway lines opened in 2013